Zvezdan Martič (born 1963 in Celje, Yugoslavia) is a Slovenian journalist and engineer. In 2001 he inaugurated the establishment of the multimedia center at RTV Slovenija and was assigned the position of project leader since its inception until 2010.  He was a member of the OLS (On line service group) at EBU (European Broadcasting Union), where he was also a member of the Benchmarking and Teletext groups. In addition, he is a College lecturer in multimedia. The last ten years he has been the host of two talk shows and scriptwriter and director of many documentaries and in last two years host and editor of daily news. Currently he is Assistant Director of TV Slovenija.

See also 
Social Innovation Camp

References

External links
 Portal RTV Slovenija
 EBU
 Personal web page of Zvezdan Martič

Slovenian journalists
1963 births
Living people
Writers from Celje
Slovenian engineers